Jeremy J. Lewis is a British businessman who founded the Amazon Recording Studios in Liverpool, United Kingdom. The recording studios are seen as one of the most iconic recording studios in the United Kingdom, with a large number of notable musicians from Black Sabbath to The Smiths recording albums at the studio. Lewis' involvement in the studio led to him working as a producer during the 1980s.

Under Lewis' guidance, Amazon studios went on to create the Parr Street Studios, which were designed and founded by Lewis. His work as a producer/re-mixer has included work for artists as diverse as China Crisis and Black Sabbath's fourteenth studio album, Headless Cross.

Career

In the early 1970s Jeremy bought the assets of recording studio, Liverpool Sound Enterprises literally the only recording studio in the Liverpool area at the time. After a change of name to Amazon Studios Lewis focused on using the studio for his own band initially with the hope of turning the studio into a commercial enterprise in the longer term.

The studio in its early days used a unique 8-track tube multitrack and various upgrades were made to the studio by Lewis. Many local artists up to this point had used the studio facilities.

At this point, few major studios were based outside London, so to begin with, Lewis' Amazon Studios rarely had notable artists recording there. In the early 1980s however, a surge of popular UK-based musicians from the North of England emerged. Many of these artists wanted to record closer to home and away from London. This led in a surge in popularity for northern recording studios, including Lewis' Amazon Studios.

Over the next decade, Lewis produced many albums for notable British musicians and bands. Over 345 notable albums and singles were recorded at the studios, with Lewis playing an integral part in their production through the studios. One of his first notable works was with Pete Wylie's Wah! Heat and also China Crisis in the late 1970s. Much of this work was under the Indie label Lewis and Pete Fulwell founded, Inevitable. In 1984, the label released a compilation album, Small Hits and Near Misses. During this era, Lewis worked on production for the album, Difficult Shapes & Passive Rhythms, Some People Think It's Fun to Entertain for China Crisis.

In 1989, Lewis worked on the production and finishing for Black Sabbath's fourteenth studio album, Headless Cross.

During the 1980s and early 1990s as founder of Amazon Studios, Lewis oversaw a number of notable albums and singles that were recorded at the recording studios. This included albums such as This Is the Sea by The Waterboys, which included the single "The Whole of the Moon", which won an Ivor Novello award. Also recorded at the studios was Ocean Rain by Echo and The Bunnymen and Meat Is Murder by The Smiths. During this period at Amazon, Lewis had 20 Double Platinum, Platinum, Gold and Silver albums for records to show for his work, and 3 Ampex Gold Reel Awards. Lewis worked closely with a number of record producers who worked for a number of years at Amazon Studios. These record producers included Gil Norton, Ken Nelson and Ian Broudie.

In order to keep the studio going in the 1990s, he moved the studio to a more desirable location in Liverpool city centre. In 1992, Lewis' major investor took over controlling interest in the company, which was deemed a coup by Keith Andrews. Following Lewis' involvement and construction of Parr Street Studios, it went on to win two separate Grammy Awards under a name change to Parr Street Studios.

Lewis moved into the dot com industry in the mid-1990s and launched a number of successful companies, including Netscan UK. In April 2013 Lewis set up Jeremy J Lewis Guitars. This is a new concept series of one piece guitars (no bolted on neck) using proprietary all titanium hardware. In 2017, Lewis was granted a patent for the unique titanium Atlantic bridge used on the guitars. The new JJL guitars are currently the most expensive electric production guitars sold in the World today. JJL Guitars Ltd now has two new models, the Atlanta and the Vecta together with a new series of guitar stands, the first of which is the JJL air-stand Falcon.

Parr Street Studios
Lewis and his business partner, Tony Smith, were responsible for the contraction of the Parr Street Studios in Liverpool, United Kingdom. The 20,000 sq ft complex consisted of 4 studios, a restaurant, a bar, a hotel and 8 offices for commercial use. The property was completed in 1992 and after Lewis left his role with the studio, it was later sold for £1.9 million in 2012.

References

English record producers
Living people
Year of birth missing (living people)